Hansen Glacier is a tributary glacier  long, flowing northeast from Mount Tuck between Veregava Ridge and Doyran Heights to join Dater Glacier west of Dickey Peak, in the Sentinel Range of the Ellsworth Mountains in Antarctica.

It was first mapped by the United States Geological Survey from surveys and U.S. Navy air photos, 1957–59, and was named by the Advisory Committee on Antarctic Names for Herbert L. Hansen, a meteorologist at South Pole Station in 1957.

See also
 List of glaciers in the Antarctic
 Glaciology

Maps
 Vinson Massif.  Scale 1:250 000 topographic map.  Reston, Virginia: US Geological Survey, 1988.
 Antarctic Digital Database (ADD). Scale 1:250000 topographic map of Antarctica. Scientific Committee on Antarctic Research (SCAR). Since 1993, regularly updated.

References

 

Glaciers of Ellsworth Land